Wally 'Pug' Warden (21 April 1906 – 18 September 1998) was an Australian rules footballer who played for 
Footscray in the Victorian Football League (VFL).

Warden, who was originally from Brunswick, holds the record for the longest suspension received by a Footscray player. The league imposed a 22-game suspension in 1928 after he was reported for 'kicking' and he subsequently missed the entire 1929 season. He later played with and coached Footscray District Football League club Kingsville.

References

Holmesby, Russell and Main, Jim (2007). The Encyclopedia of AFL Footballers. 7th ed. Melbourne: Bas Publishing.

1906 births
Western Bulldogs players
Brunswick Football Club players
1998 deaths
Australian rules footballers from Victoria (Australia)